Mohsin Ahmedbhai Dodia (born 7 June 1984) is an Indian cricketer who plays for Saurashtra. He made his first-class debut on 30 October in the 2015–16 Ranji Trophy.

References

External links
 

1984 births
Living people
Indian cricketers
Saurashtra cricketers
People from Bhavnagar